Lynn Kriengkrairut (born October 4, 1988) is an American former competitive ice dancer. With partner Logan Giulietti-Schmitt, she is a two-time (2011–2012) Ice Challenge champion and the 2012 U.S. national pewter medalist.

Career 
Kriengkrairut began skating at the age of six and a half. She competed in single skating and solo dance before teaming up with Jon Lauten, with whom she skated for one year.

Logan Giulietti-Schmitt contacted Kriengkrairut after seeing her on IcePartnerSearch. They began skating together in July 2006, agreeing to form a partnership on the second day of a planned three-day tryout. The two were coached by Yuri Chesnichenko and Yaroslava Nechaeva from the start of their partnership. They won the junior bronze medal at the 2007 U.S. Championships in their first season together.

Kriengkrairut/Giulietti-Schmitt received a host invitation to compete at 2010 Skate America where they finished 6th. At the 2011 U.S. Championships, they were in fourth after the short dance but dropped to fifth overall after a fall at the end of their free dance.

At the 2012 U.S. Championships, Kriengkrairut/Giulietti-Schmitt placed fourth in both segments and won the pewter medal. The following season, they were fifth at the 2013 U.S. Championships. They changed coaches in February 2013, joining Igor Shpilband in Novi, Michigan. Kriengkrairut sustained a concussion in late June 2013. The two decided to retire from competition on April 24, 2014.

Personal life 
Kriengkrairut is of Thai descent. Her mother is a pediatric neurologist and her father a pulmonologist. She was raised in Bismarck, North Dakota and attended Century High School. In 2004, she underwent surgery after being diagnosed with pulmonary sequestration.

Kriengkrairut studied at the University of Michigan with a focus on brain, behavior, and cognitive sciences. As of March 2021, she has finished her MD from University of North Dakota School of Medicine and Health Sciences and has matched into Internal medicine residency at St Joseph's in Ann Arbor where she will start her training in July 2021.

Programs 
(with Giulietti-Schmitt)

Competitive highlights 
(with Giulietti-Schmitt)

References

External links

 
 Lynn Kriengkrairut / Logan Giulietti-Schmitt at IceNetwork
 Official site

Living people
1988 births
American female ice dancers
Sportspeople from Staten Island
American sportspeople of Thai descent
University of Michigan alumni
21st-century American women